Hopper's Hall is a grade II listed house in Watton Road, Datchworth, Hertfordshire. It dates from around 1640 with minor additions and alterations since. Hoppers End, Hoppers Barn, and Hoppers Lodge are all adjacent.

References

External links

Grade II listed buildings in Hertfordshire
Grade II listed houses
Buildings and structures completed in 1640